State Road 13 (SR 13) is a  state highway in the U.S. state of Florida, running north from SR 16 near Green Cove Springs, through Switzerland to Jacksonville on the east shore of the St. Johns River.

Route description
Its southern terminus is with SR 16 and County Road 13 (CR 13) near Green Cove Springs. CR 13 continues south to Hastings and then southeast, along old Dixie Highway to U.S. Route 1 (US 1, unsigned SR 5) near Bunnell.

SR 13 is known as San Jose Boulevard for much of its run through Duval County (coextensive with the city limits of Jacksonville). As it approaches Downtown Jacksonville, it becomes Hendricks Avenue, then turns west along Prudential Drive and then turns into San Marco Boulevard before crossing the St. Johns River at the Acosta Bridge. The road ends at an interchange with Riverside Avenue (former US 17).

A portion of the route that runs along the east bank of the St. Johns River, south of Jacksonville, is designated the William Bartram Scenic and Historic Highway.

Major intersections

Related roads

County Road 13

County Road 13 (CR 13) is a road in western St. Johns County, Florida that runs from its southern terminus of US 1 near Bunnell in Flagler County, Florida, traveling northwest along old Dixie Highway until it reaches Hastings. This includes a gap in the route exists between CR 205 in Espanola and CR 204 in St Johns County, much of which is a dirt road. North of Hastings, it travels along an overlap with Florida State Road 207 until it reaches Spuds, then branches off to the north running along the east bank of the St. Johns River until it reaches its northern terminus at SR 13 and SR 16.

County Road 13A

County Road 13A (CR 13A) is a  spur route in St. Johns County.

County Road 13B

County Road 13B (CR 13B) is a county-suffixed local route on the west side of SR 13, named Fruit Cove Road in Fruit Cove.

See also

References

External links

William Bartram Scenic and Historic Highway

013
SR013
013
013
013
013
013
013
1945 establishments in Florida